The Grosser Preis der Landeshauptstadt Düsseldorf is a Group 3 flat horse race in Germany open to thoroughbreds aged three years or older. It is run at Düsseldorf over a distance of 1,700 metres (1 mile and 99 yards), and it is scheduled to take place each year in October.

History
The event was formerly known as the Grosser Preis von Düsseldorf. The first version was established in 1918. Its date and distance were frequently modified during the early part of its history.

In the post-war years the race was usually held in May or June. For a period it was restricted to horses aged four or older and contested over 2,400 metres.

The Grosser Preis von Düsseldorf was given Group 2 status in 1972. It was shortened to 2,200 metres in 1979. It was switched to April and cut to 1,700 metres in 1983. It was rescheduled for the autumn and opened to three-year-olds in 1985.

The race was downgraded to Group 3 level in 1998. It was renamed the Grosser Preis der Landeshauptstadt Düsseldorf in 2002.

Records
Most successful horse (3 wins):
 Lombard – 1971, 1972, 1973
 Peppercorn – 2000, 2001, 2004

Leading jockey (4 wins):
 Max Schmidt – Kameradschaftler (1938), Osterglaube (1941), Lockfalke (1942), Patrizier (1944)
 Hein Bollow – Asterios (1951), Jonkheer (1953), Optimus (1958), Kaiseradler (1962)
 Peter Alafi – Opponent (1966), Königsstuhl (1981), Orofino (1982), Mister Rocks (1983)

Leading trainer (8 wins):
 Heinz Jentzsch – Pantheon (1964), Lombard (1971, 1972, 1973), Arratos (1974), Whip It Quick (1976), Zampano (1987), Risen Raven (1994)
 (note: the trainers of some of the early winners are unknown)

Winners since 1970

Earlier winners
 1918: Gisela
 1919: Eleganz
 1920–21: no race
 1922: Siebenschläfer
 1923: Leichtsinn
 1924: Freizeit
 1925: Freigeist
 1926: Sonnenblümchen
 1927: Nobelmann
 1928: Piemont
 1929: Linz
 1930: Stalheck
 1931: Gebt Feuer / Volumnius *
 1932: Audi
 1933: Volumnius
 1934: Palander
 1935: Ideolog

 1936: Heimfahrt / Perlfischer *
 1937: Kameradschaftler
 1938: Kameradschaftler
 1939: Barsdorf
 1940: no race
 1941: Osterglaube
 1942: Lockfalke
 1943: Flying Call
 1944: Patrizier
 1945: no race
 1946: Berggeist
 1947: Olymp
 1948: Nebelwerfer
 1949: Nebelwerfer
 1950: Treiber
 1951: Asterios
 1952: Schütze

 1953: Jonkheer
 1954: Mangon
 1955: Stani
 1956: Masetto
 1957: Traumgeist
 1958: Optimus
 1959: Pfalzteufel
 1960: Waidmann
 1961: Windbruch
 1962: Kaiseradler
 1963: Windbruch
 1964: Pantheon
 1965: Mercurius
 1966: Opponent
 1967: Birgitz
 1968: Birgitz
 1969: Ballyboy

* The 1931 and 1936 races were dead-heats and have joint winners.

See also
 List of German flat horse races
 Recurring sporting events established in 1918 – this race is included under its former title, Grosser Preis von Düsseldorf.

References
 Racing Post / siegerlisten.com:
 1985, 1986, 1987, 1988, 

 galopp-sieger.de – Großer Preis der Landeshauptstadt Düsseldorf.
 horseracingintfed.com – International Federation of Horseracing Authorities – Race Detail (2012).
 pedigreequery.com – Grosser Preis von Düsseldorf – Düsseldorf.

Horse races in Germany
Open mile category horse races